Gary Berne (born January 14, 1944) is a sports shooter who represents the United States Virgin Islands. He competed in the mixed skeet event at the 1984 Summer Olympics.

References

External links
 

1944 births
Living people
United States Virgin Islands male sport shooters
Olympic shooters of the United States Virgin Islands
Shooters at the 1984 Summer Olympics
Place of birth missing (living people)